Seguin or Séguín is a French and Gascon name. It may be a Frankish name, from Germanic origin (sig-, that is, "victory", cf. modern German sieg, and -win, that is, "friend", related to modern English "win"). Seghin, Sigiwinus, Siguvinus, Siguinus, Siguin, Sigiwin, Sigwin, Sigoin and Segouin are alternate variants. According to Jean de Jaurgain quoting primary source Saint Andrew of Bordeaux, the original Vascon name written in Latin was Sihiminum, related to Basque Seme(no), meaning 'son' (cf. ancient Aquitanian Basque "seni" meaning 'boy' > modern "sehi"). It is also spelled  Scimin, Skimin, Scemenus, Semen, Semeno, Xemen, or Ximen and gave rise to the Castilian Ximeno and Jimeno. Both Semen and Seguin, unrelated names, are found in sources.

First name
Seguin I of Gascony, Duke of Gascony from 812 until 816
Seguin II of Gascony (died 846), Count of Bordeaux and Saintes from 840 and Duke of Gascony from 845, son or grandson of Seguin I
Seguin de Badefol (1330–1366), French mercenary leader during the Hundred Years' War, who fought at the Battle of Brignais 
Seguin de Lugny, Bishop of Mâcon (see Ancient Diocese of Mâcon) from 1242 to 1262 
Sigwin von Are (died 1089), Archbishop of Cologne

Surname
 Albert Séguin (1891–1948), French gymnast and 1924 Olympic champion
 Armand Séguin (1767–1835), French chemist and physiologist
 Armand Séguin (painter) (1869–1903), French post-Impressionist painter, great-grandson of the above
 Arthur Seguin (1809–1852), English/American operatic bass singer
 Charles Avila Séguin (1883–1965), Canadian lawyer and politician
 Dan Seguin (born 1948), Canadian retired National Hockey League player
 Édouard Séguin (1812–1880), French physician and educationalist
 Erasmo Seguín (1782–1857), politician and supporter of the Texas Revolution
 Fernand Seguin (1922–1988), Canadian biochemist, professor and radio and television host of science programs
 François Séguin, Canadian award-winning production designer, art director and set decorator
 Juan Seguín (1806–1890), Tejano hero of the Texas Revolution
 Julianne Séguin (born 1996), Canadian singles and pairs figure skater
 Marc Seguin (1786–1875), French engineer and inventor, whose name appears on the Eiffel Tower, as a supporter of the project.
 Marc Séguin (painter) (born 1970), French-Canadian painter and novelist
 Napoléon Séguin (1865–1940), French-Canadian politician
 Nicolas Seguin (born 1990), French footballer
 Patrick Seguin
 Paul-Arthur Séguin (1875–1946), French-Canadian politician
 Philippe Séguin (1943–2010), French politician
 Tyler Seguin (born 1992), Canadian National Hockey League player
 Wolfgang Seguin (born 1945), East German retired association footballer
 Yves Séguin (born 1951), French-Canadian former politician